Valle is a village in Ålesund Municipality in Møre og Romsdal county, Norway. The village is located on the eastern end of the island of Oksenøya, along the northern shore of the Storfjorden.

References

Villages in Møre og Romsdal
Ålesund